Bálint Gaál (born 14 July 1991) is a Hungarian football player who plays for Ajka.

Club statistics

Updated to games played as of 19 May 2019.

References
 HLSZ
 MLSZ
 

1991 births
Living people
Sportspeople from Szombathely
Hungarian footballers
Association football forwards
TSV Hartberg players
Szombathelyi Haladás footballers
FC Ajka players
Zalaegerszegi TE players
Soproni VSE players
Vasas SC players
Győri ETO FC players
BFC Siófok players
Nemzeti Bajnokság I players
Nemzeti Bajnokság II players
Hungarian expatriate footballers
Expatriate footballers in Austria
Hungarian expatriate sportspeople in Austria